Thiago Galhardo Nascimento Rocha (born 20 July 1989), known as Thiago Galhardo, is a Brazilian professional footballer who plays as an attacking midfielder for Fortaleza.

Club career
Born in São João del Rei, Minas Gerais, Galhardo joined Bangu's youth setup in 2008 after turning down a job offer in Petrobras. He made his debut as a senior on 20 January 2010, coming on as a second-half substitute in a 3–0 Campeonato Carioca away loss against Fluminense.

Galhardo scored his first senior goal on 27 February 2010, netting the second in a 3–0 win at Resende. He finished the tournament with 15 appearances, as his side achieved a mid-table position.

After impressing in 2011 Campeonato Carioca, Galhardo joined Brasileirão Série A club Botafogo on 14 April 2011, on loan until December. He made his debut in the category on 22 May, starting in a 1–0 away loss against Palmeiras.

On 19 January 2012, Galhardo was loaned to Comercial de Ribeirão Preto until May. Rarely used by the club, he returned to Bangu and served subsequent loans at América de Natal and Remo.

After having unpaid wages, Galhardo left Remo in June 2013 and returned to Bangu. The following year he represented Boa, Cametá and Brasiliense, appearing sparingly in all of them.

On 3 January 2015, Galhardo agreed to a deal at Madureira, and scored five goals and amassed seven assists in 14 matches during the year's Carioca. On 23 April he returned the top tier, signing a three-year deal with Coritiba.

Galhardo scored his first goal in the main category on 16 May 2015, netting the first in a 2–0 home win against Grêmio. He contributed with 25 appearances, as his side narrowly avoided relegation.

On 20 January 2016, Galhardo was loaned to Red Bull Brasil until the end of the 2016 Campeonato Paulista.

On 6 January 2017, Galhardo was loaned to Albirex Niigata until the end of the 2017 season.  In April 2019, he returned to his home country and joined Ceará.

On 8 January 2020, after scoring 12 goals for Vozão, Galhardo signed a one-year contract with Internacional. He immediately became a regular starter, scoring a career-best 23 goals during the campaign as his club finished second in the league.

On 25 August 2021, Galhardo joined La Liga side RC Celta de Vigo on loan, reuniting with former Internacional manager Eduardo Coudet.

Personal life
Galhardo's younger brother, Gabriel, is also a footballer and a midfielder. Both were groomed at Bangu, and played together in 2012.

Career statistics

References

External links

1989 births
Living people
People from São João del-Rei
Brazilian footballers
Association football midfielders
Campeonato Brasileiro Série A players
Campeonato Brasileiro Série B players
Campeonato Brasileiro Série D players
Bangu Atlético Clube players
Botafogo de Futebol e Regatas players
Comercial Futebol Clube (Ribeirão Preto) players
América Futebol Clube (RN) players
Clube do Remo players
Boa Esporte Clube players
Brasiliense Futebol Clube players
Madureira Esporte Clube players
Coritiba Foot Ball Club players
Red Bull Brasil players
Associação Atlética Ponte Preta players
CR Vasco da Gama players
Ceará Sporting Club players
Sport Club Internacional players
Fortaleza Esporte Clube players
J1 League players
Albirex Niigata players
La Liga players
RC Celta de Vigo players
Brazilian expatriate footballers
Brazilian expatriate sportspeople in Japan
Brazilian expatriate sportspeople in Spain
Expatriate footballers in Japan
Expatriate footballers in Spain
Sportspeople from Minas Gerais